Riverside Cemetery is an historic cemetery at 752 Pleasant Street in Pawtucket, Rhode Island. The cemetery was established in 1874, and is Pawtucket's instance of a rural cemetery.

The cemetery's creation was championed by John W. Davis (1826–1907), a local politician who later served two terms as Governor of Rhode Island, and was for many years the cemetery's resident manager, living in the cemetery manager's house, which was built around the time of the cemetery's founding. Davis himself is buried there and the cemetery has been run by his descendants.

The cemetery was listed on the National Register of Historic Places in 1983.

See also

 National Register of Historic Places listings in Pawtucket, Rhode Island

References

External links
 
 

Cemeteries on the National Register of Historic Places in Rhode Island
Buildings and structures in Pawtucket, Rhode Island
National Register of Historic Places in Pawtucket, Rhode Island
1874 establishments in Rhode Island